The Toronto Light Opera Association was an opera company based in Toronto, Ontario, Canada that specialized in performing the works of Gilbert and Sullivan. It was founded in 1940 and disbanded in 1955.

History
Members of the association first came together in 1940 when Howard Mawson and some friends who had appeared in collegiate productions of Gilbert & Sullivan operettas asked Mawson's father Frederick, a Toronto choirmaster and conductor, to teach them more about the performance of Gilbert & Sullivan's music. Frederick Mawson, with the help of his son organized what was to become the Toronto Light Opera Association. Frederick Mawson also served as the association's music director and led it in presenting operettas in a number of venues in Toronto. Their first operetta, Trial by Jury, was staged in 1942 with H.M.S. Pinafore staged the following year. There were no productions in 1944, as many of the young cast members were involved in the war effort of World War II.

In 1945 the first notices naming the troupe as the Toronto Light Opera Association appeared in the local news. In 1946 the Toronto Daily Star termed it "an excellent organization", and another review in 1950 praised the "enjoyable acting and singing". Mawson was assisted in most of the productions by Alfred Kidney, who acted as stage director. After a number of successful productions, the association disbanded in 1955.

Productions

Between 1942 and 1950 the company presented six different Gilbert and Sullivan operas, mostly those in the popular repertoire. The actors and singers were ably accompanied by pianist Winnifred Smith Stewart. Edward Wodson of The Evening Telegram described her as "a solo pianist whose touch gives the piano a song always delightful". The Association's productions between 1942 and 1950 were as follows:

 1942: The first work to be presented was Trial by Jury, performed once in March and again in October 1942. 
 1943: H.M.S. Pinafore was next, presented twice in March and November 1943.
 1945: The cast of H.M.S. Pinafore, staged in May 1945 at the Northern Vocational School auditorium, included Geoffrey Hatton of D'Oyly Carte experience.
 1946: This was followed by The Pirates of Penzance in March 1946 at Danforth Technical School auditorium.
 1947: This year saw a March presentation of Patience at the Central School of Commerce auditorium. Swords for the production were borrowed from the Governor General's Horse Guards. An Evening Telegram review stated, "The general effect was indeed much better than some of the professional performances seen here in recent years". This was followed in December by a production of The Mikado at Danforth Technical School auditorium with a cast of 40. The Toronto Evening Telegram described this performance as "a notable success" in which "Sullivan's priceless music was sung and played with such a sweet, sparkling animation and precision that many numbers took on a new life that surprised".
 1948: In 1948 two productions were presented: The Pirates of Penzance played for a second time in the company's history in April, this time at Northern Vocational School auditorium, and was deemed by one critic "a bright and richly musical offering".  Iolanthe followed that November at the Temple Theatre, and was labelled by The Evening Telegram "one of the brightest, sweetest singing and clearest speaking presentations of this loveliest of all G. and S. operas seen and heard in Toronto in the last ten years."
 1949: A double production of Trial by Jury with H.M.S. Pinafore was presented in May, 1949 at Danforth Technical School. A review in the Toronto Evening Telegram proclaimed both the soloists and the choruses to be excellent, and deemed the singing of Harry Stitch to be "sweet and vibrant".  In November The Yeoman of the Guard at Bloor Collegiate Institute followed. 
 1950: Another production took place in 1950 when The Gondoliers was presented in November at the Bloor Collegiate auditorium. A review in the Toronto Daily Star praised the acting and singing, but chided the cast for "slapping each other around more than necessary".

Notable members
Howard Mawson, a bass baritone who played a role in many of the productions, went on to have a notable career in other operatic and dramatic organizations. He became a founding member of the Toronto branch of the Gilbert and Sullivan Society. His wife Elizabeth Mawson (née Burlington), a mezzo-soprano and a regular performer in the association, would later become well known for her long-standing role as Marilla in the Anne of Green Gables – The Musical production at the Charlottetown Festival; she also performed with the Canadian Opera Company. Both Howard and Elizabeth would also later perform in the Eaton Operatic Society of Toronto.  Geoffrey Hatton had been a member of the famous D'Oyly Carte Opera Company before moving to Toronto and continuing to both perform and direct in various musical organizations. Alfred Kidney was involved as performer, director, producer or coach in dozens of productions in Scotland, Ireland and Canada over a period of 40 years. Rose McDonald of the Toronto Evening Telegram wrote, "There is no one more experienced hereabouts in Gilbert and Sullivan business."

Other performers who went on to further musical accomplishments include Bertram Kelso (Reading Choral Society, Toronto Mendelssohn Choir), Godfrey Rideout (symphonic composer and conductor, Eaton Operatic Society), Howard Russell (Oshawa Choral Society, Serenata Singers), Bill Wright (Orpheus Theatre), and Bert Scarborough (30 productions of the Eaton Operatic Society).

References

Canadian opera companies
Gilbert and Sullivan performing groups
Musical groups established in 1940
1955 disestablishments in Ontario